Linda Morgan (born 1942), now known as Linda Hardberger, became known as the "miracle girl" following the collision of two large passenger ships in the North Atlantic Ocean on the foggy night of July 25, 1956.

The 14-year-old girl, born in Mexico City, Mexico, was sharing a two-bed cabin with her younger half-sister on the SS Andrea Doria en route from Gibraltar when the ship was struck broadside by the prow of the MS Stockholm near Nantucket. During the collision, she was somehow lifted out of her bed and onto the Stockholms crushed bow, landing safely behind a bulwark as the two ships scraped past each other before separating as the fatally stricken Andrea Doria disappeared back into the fog.

In the ensuing confusion, a Stockholm crewman heard her calling for her mother in Spanish, an unusual language on the Swedish ship. A crewman who spoke Spanish was able to translate. The teen apparently was first to grasp what must have happened, saying to 36-year-old Bernabe Polanco Garcia: "I was on the Andrea Doria. Where am I now?"

Eight-year-old Joan Cianfarra, the sister sleeping on the adjoining bed in Linda's cabin was killed. Her step-father, Camille Cianfarra, a longtime foreign correspondent for The New York Times, stationed in Spain, was also killed in the adjacent cabin he shared with the girls' mother. They were two of 46 passengers and crew who died in the impact areas on the two ships. After all the surviving passengers and crew were evacuated by several rescue ships (most notably the S.S. Ile de France), the Andrea Doria capsized and sank the next morning. With ships of several nations transporting survivors, communication of news to the waiting families was difficult. Linda Morgan and her younger sister were both listed among the missing passengers in early reports.

Linda's father, ABC Radio Network news commentator Edward P. Morgan, was based in New York City. On his daily broadcast, he reported the collision of the ocean liners, not telling his thousands of listeners that his daughter had been aboard the Andrea Doria and was believed to have been killed.

Linda, who suffered a broken arm, was quickly dubbed the "miracle girl" by the news media as the story of her survival and the circumstances spread. She returned to New York City aboard the crippled Stockholm, where she was reunited with her mother Jane Cianfarra, who had been severely injured in the cabin where her husband had died, and her father. Edward Morgan then made another broadcast less able to conceal his emotions, describing the difference between reporting the news about strangers and his own loved ones.

Linda Morgan was admitted to St. Vincent's Hospital in New York, where her broken arm was placed in traction. When Polanco, her Spanish-speaking crewman benefactor, was on a weekend leave from the Stockholm, he went to the hospital to pay a visit. Sister Loretta Bernard, administrator of the hospital, gave Polanco a Miraculous Medal of Our Lady. Then Linda's father, who had also worked in Mexico, greeted him with a hearty embrace. "Hombre, hombre," said Mr. Morgan, "Man, man how can I ever thank you?"

Morgan suffered from survivor's guilt, as her stepfather and younger half-sister had been killed and her mother badly injured. Morgan moved to San Antonio, Texas, in 1970. Her husband since 1968, Phil Hardberger, became Mayor of San Antonio in June 2005.

References

External links
The key to Cabin 52, as found on SS Stockholm

1942 births
Living people
People from San Antonio